The Stalin Monument in The Hague, Netherlands – is an art object, conceptual bust of Joseph Stalin, created by Vitaly Komar and Alexander Melamid (so called Komar and Melamid tandem). Stalin's bust is placed in a phone booth. It was opened in 1986. The monument is located near the museums, Museon and The Hague Municipal Museum, The Hague Museum of Photography.

References

Works about Joseph Stalin
Monuments and memorials in the Netherlands
Buildings and structures in The Hague
Busts (sculpture)
Removed statues
Statues of Joseph Stalin